Manouchehr Arianpour Kashani (2 September 1929 – 22 December 2021) was an Iranian translator and lexicographer. He is the son of Abbas and Robaneh Aryanpur-Kashani.

Life 
Manouchehr Arianpour was born on September 2, 1929, in Kashan. He founded the College of Translation with the help of his father in 1969. After graduating, he taught at American universities. In 1969, he and his father founded the College of Translation in Tehran a Four Year B.A. degree program where the students were educated in various fields of translation. He received his doctorate from the University of Colorado in 1958 with a dissertation on Walter Raleigh.

Manouchehr Arianpour Kashani in the early years of the  1970s with the help of students and some professors of the College he began to compile the Aryanpur Dictionary of English Lexicology, which results in a variety of Persian to English and English to Persian dictionaries. In addition to the dictionary, he has authored and translated other works. One of these works is called "Leading English Grammar and Writing Ritual".

Death 
Manouchehr Arianpour died on December 22, 2021, at the age of 92 in the United States. He was a naturalized citizen of the United States.

Works 
Some of his works are:

The Aryanpur Progressive English–Persian Dictionary
 Pishro Arianpour High School Culture
 Arianpour Leading Vocabulary Guide
 Arianpour English grammar and writing ritual
 Persian words in English (Siri in the phonology of etymology).
 Farhang Bozorg One-volume Persian to Persian Pishro Arianpour.

See also 

 The Aryanpur Progressive English–Persian Dictionary

References 

1929 births
2021 deaths
English–Persian translators
Iranian lexicographers
University of Colorado alumni
People from Kashan